Solanum symonii is a species of flowering plant in the family Solanaceae and is native to near-coastal areas of Western Australia and South Australia. It is an erect shrub with egg-shaped to lance-shaped leaves and pale lavender-purple flowers.

Description
The leaves lack prickles and are shallowly lobed.

Taxonomy
This species was first formally described in 1859 by Ferdinand von Mueller who gave it the name Solanum fasciculatum in Fragmenta Phytographiae Australiae from specimens collected near the Phillips River. Mueller's name was illegitimate because it had already been used for a different species (Solanum fasciculatum Vell., now known as Athenaea fasciculata). In 1963, Hansjörg Eichler changed the name to Solanum symonii in the journalTaxon. The specific epithet (symonii) honours David Eric Symon.

Distribution and habitat
Solanum symonii grows in sandy soil on coastal limestone and sand dunes from Geraldton in north-western Western Australia to the Yorke Peninsula in South Australia.

References

symonii
Rosids of Western Australia
Plants described in 1963